YG Future Strategy Office, abbreviated as YG FSO, is a South Korean streaming television series on Netflix starring Seungri as the head of YG Entertainment's fictional strategic resources department, with Yoo Byung-jae, Baek Young-kwang, Kim Ga-eun, Son Se-bin, and Sechs Kies' Lee Jai-jin starring as his co-workers. Various artists from YG Entertainment also appeared as guests.

The show is directed by Park Joon-soo, who produced the South Korean mockumentary show The God of Music 2, and is written by Kim Min-suk, who was one of the writers for SNL Korea.

Synopsis 
In order to deal with its troublemaking artists and misfits, YG Entertainment forms a new department called the Future Strategy office, with Seungri as head of the department. The show follows him and his co-workers struggling to regain the company's reputation in the midst of a crisis. The black comedy series was based loosely on YG Entertainment artists' real-life drug and sex scandals.

Development and production
The show was first announced on February 22, 2018 through a press release published by Netflix.

Producer Park Joon-soo declared to have been inspired by Samsung's former Future Strategy Office, which used to be an important department of the company before it was disbanded. He went on saying that he has "been producing a series of shows that make fun of the dark sides of Korea's entertainment industry" and he thought of YG because it was "going through a dark patch" at the time.

During filming, the crew and cast were given different versions of the script in order "to make the show as realistic as possible." However, Seungri mentioned during a press conference — which took place in Seoul on October 1, 2018 — that he seldom read the scripts, wanting "to show the real [him]" as much as he could.

Cast

Main

YG FSO team
 Seungri as the head and consultant of YG FSO
 Yoo Byung-jae as a staff member who runs errands for the department
 Lee Jai-jin as an employee who rarely goes to work
 Son Se-bin is an assistant of the department with calm air
 Kim Ga-eun is the financial manager of the department with a direct personality that is always "challenging" Seungri
 Park Chung-hwan as the assistant manager

Other regulars
 Baek Young-kwang as Seungri's manager and the department's bodyguard
 Choi Shin-deok as the department's bodyguard
 Jinu (Jinusean)

Special appearances 

 Yang Hyun-suk
 Blackpink
 Daesung
 Nam Tae-hyun
 Kim So-young
 Winner
 Oh Sang-jin
 Jinusean
 Park Bom
 One
 Son Se-eun
 Son Se-bin
 iKon
 Sunmi
 Kim Chung-ha
 Son Na-eun
 Yoo In-na
 Lee Hi
 Lee Su-hyun

Episodes
Each episode features a quote by Yang Hyun-suk, YG's chairman, which relates to the episode's story. The quotes are shown after the opening credits.

Reception
At the show's press conference, Seungri announced, "YG is literally in crisis", which was later compared to YG's current real-life predicament by The Korea Times reporter, Jung Hae-myoung, at the onset of the Burning Sun scandal. It received viewer complaints about scenes of sexual harassment and racism, including one where Seungri chides a male model for not complying with a female foreign investor's request for him to get naked on a webcam with her; although others were happy with the celebrity cast.

References

External links
 YG Future Strategy Office at Netflix
 

Korean-language Netflix original programming
Mockumentary television series
2010s workplace comedy television series
Workplace comedy television series
South Korean variety television shows
2018 South Korean television series debuts
Television series by YG Entertainment